The 2013–14 Iowa State Cyclones men's basketball team represented Iowa State University during the 2013–14 NCAA Division I men's basketball season. The Cyclones were coached by Fred Hoiberg, who was in his 4th season. They played their home games at Hilton Coliseum in Ames, Iowa and competed in the Big 12 Conference.

They finished the season 28–8, 11–7 in Big 12 play to finish in a tie for third place.  They defeated Kansas State, Kansas, and Baylor to become champions of the Big 12 Conference tournament to earn and automatic bid to the NCAA tournament.  In the NCAA Tournament they defeated North Carolina Central and North Carolina to advance to the Sweet Sixteen where they lost to eventual national champion UConn without the Cyclones' third-leading scorer Georges Niang who suffered a season ending injury in the opening round game.

Previous season

The Cyclones finished 23–12, and 11–7 in Big 12 play to finish 4th in the regular season conference standings.  They defeated Oklahoma then lost to Kansas in the semifinals of the Big 12 tournament.  They received an at-large bid to the NCAA tournament where they defeated Notre Dame and lost to Ohio State.

Offseason departures

Recruiting

Prep recruits

Incoming transfers

Roster

Schedule and results

|-
!colspan=12 style=""|Exhibition
|-

|-
!colspan=12 style=""| Regular Season
|-

|-
!colspan=12 style=""|Big 12 Regular Season

|-
!colspan=12 style=""| Big 12 Tournament
|-

|-

|-

|-
!colspan=12 style=""| NCAA Tournament
|-

|-

Rankings

Awards and honors

All-Americans

Melvin Ejim (1st Team)
DeAndre Kane (2nd Team)

Academic All-American

Melvin Ejim

All-Conference Selections

Melvin Ejim (1st Team)
DeAndre Kane (1st Team)
Georges Niang (3rd Team)

Academic All-Big 12 First Team

Melvin Ejim
Percy Gibson
Alex-Javad Assadipour 

Big 12 Newcomer of the Year

DeAndre Kane

Big 12 All-Newcomer Team

DeAndre Kane

References

Iowa State Cyclones men's basketball seasons
Iowa State
Iowa State
Iowa State Cyc
Iowa State Cyc